This article lists notable alumni and students of the Virginia Commonwealth University in Richmond, Virginia.

Art

Notable artists who are alumni and students of VCU School of the Arts.

Diana al-Hadid – sculptor and installation artist (MFA 2005)
Trudy Benson – abstract artist (BFA 2007)
James Bumgardner – painter, multi-media artist, RPI, VCU art faculty (BFA 1955)
Tony Cokes – video artist (MFA 1985)
Rose Datoc Dall – painter (BFA 1990)
Tara Donovan – sculptor (MFA 1999)
Torkwase Dyson – painter (BFA 1999)
Joseph Craig English – printmaker (BFA 1970)
Donwan Harrell – fashion designer, founder of Prps and Akademiks (BFA 1989)
Lisa Hoke – sculptor and installation artist (BFA 1978)
Sterling Hundley – illustrator and painter (BFA 1998)
Abby Kasonik – painter (BFA 1998)
Nate Lewis – cut paper sculptor (BS 2009)
Whitney Lynn – sculptor and performance artist (BFA 2004)
Owen Lee Franklin - Artist and historian (BFA 2021)
Philip B. Meggs – graphic designer and historian of design (BFA 1964, MFA 1971)
Eric Millikin – conceptual, internet, video and performance artist (MFA 2021)
Janice Smith – furniture maker (BFA 1976)
Carol Sutton – painter and sculptor (BFA 1967)
Alice Tangerini – botanical illustrator (BFA 1972)
Alessandra Torres – performance and installation artist (MFA 2006)
Charles Vess -- fantasy and comics illustrator (BFA 1974)

Business 

 Norman Sisisky - Founder of Petersburg Bottling Company, later becoming Pepsi  (BBA)
 Christopher Poole - Founder of 4chan
 William Giffords - CEO of Altria (BBA)

Government

Watkins Abbitt, Jr. – member of the Virginia House of Delegates
Nancy McFalane – Former Mayor of Raleigh, North Carolina (2011–2019)
Rob Wittman – Republican member of the United States House of Representatives, representing Virginia's 1st congressional district
Yasonna Laoly – Minister of Law and Human Rights of Indonesia (2014–present)
Will Sessoms - Mayor of Virginia Beach, VA (2008-2018)

Media
Mamé Adjei – runner up of America's Next Top Model cycle 22
David Baldacci – author, best known for his novel Absolute Power (1996)
Rachel Beanland - author of Florence Adler Swims Forever
Macon Blair - actor and Sundance Grand Jury Prize-winning filmmaker, known for his collaborations with Jeremy Saulnier
Caressa Cameron – 2010 Miss America
Daryl Cobb – author, national children's educational presenter
Chad L. Coleman – actor
Andrea Detwiler – 2006 Daytime Emmy winner
Stephen Furst – actor and director, known as "Flounder" in the National Lampoon classic Animal House (1978) as well as TV series St. Elsewhere and Babylon 5
Jason Butler Harner – Broadway, television, and film actor; performed in original production of Coast of Utopia; was in Clint Eastwood's Oscar-nominated film Changeling
Bilal Khan - Pakistani singer and actor
Zachary Knighton – actor, ABC series Happy Endings
Boris Kodjoe – actor, model
Robert Lanham – author, best known for his book The Hipster Handbook (2003)
Debbie Matenopoulos – TV host, known for co-hosting ABC's The View, The Daily 10, and TV Guide Channel's The Screening Room
Wiley Miller – cartoonist and author of the comic strip Non Sequitur
Caelynn Miller-Keyes - Runner-Up Miss USA 2018, Bachelor and Bachelor in Paradise Contestant
Trevor Moore - comedian and founding member of  The Whitest Kids U' Know
Howard Owen - journalist, author of crime fiction and the novel Littlejohn.
Jay Pharoah – comedian and Saturday Night Live cast member
Jon Pineda - award-winning poet and novelist
Christopher Poole, aka moot – founder of 4chan
Kevin Powers – novelist and poet, known for The Yellow Birds (2013), a finalist for the National Book Award
Tom Robbins – author, best known for his novel Even Cowgirls Get the Blues (1976)
Steve Segal - comic artist, animation director
Robb Spewak – producer and radio personality for The Don and Mike Show and The Mike O'Meara Show
Rose Szabo - author of What Big Teeth
Steve Rasnic Tem - horror fiction writer, winner of the World Fantasy,  British Fantasy and Bram Stoker Awards
Phil Trumbo - film animator, artist
Brandon Wardell – comedian and Twitter personality
Mike Wieringo – comic book artist for Marvel and DC comics; co-creator of Image Comics series Tellos

Music
Chino Amobi - experimental electronic musician
Anhayla – singer-songwriter, guitarist
Sam Beam – singer/songwriter known as Iron and Wine
Nickelus F - rapper, producer, videographer
GWAR – several founding members of the band
Lamb of God – several founding members of the band
Stefan Lessard – bassist for Dave Matthews Band
Matthew Ramsey -  songwriter, lead singer for Old Dominion
Nate Smith - drummer, songwriter, producer, and three-time Grammy nominee 
Eric Stanley – violinist, composer
Robbin Thompson – singer-songwriter
Steve West – drummer of the indie rock band Pavement and front man for Marble Valley
  Gordy Haab -- composer of the Star Wars video games music and multiple award winner in that genre.
 Lucy Dacus - singer-songwriter

Science

 Arpana Agrawal - psychiatric geneticist and professor of psychiatry, 2018 Theodore Reich Young Investigator Award
 Hunter "Patch" Adams – founder of the Gesundheit! Institute and subject of the movie Patch Adams
Baruj Benacerraf – winner of the 1980 Nobel Prize in Medicine
Ann S. Fulcher – abdominal radiologist  and chair of the department of radiology  at Virginia Commonwealth University/Medical College of Medicine 
Saul Krugman– medical researcher who discovered a vaccine against hepatitis B
Arpad Vass – research scientist, forensic anthropologist and professor

Sports

Yann Bonato – former European professional basketball player; former French National Team member; member of France's silver medal-winning men's basketball team at the 2000 Sydney Olympics; played one season (1990–91) at VCU
Mo Alie-Cox - current tight end for the Indianapolis Colts
Troy Daniels – current shooting guard for Olimpia Milano
Andrew Dykstra – MLS goalkeeper for D.C. United; has also played with the Chicago Fire in MLS
Treveon Graham - current forward in the G League
Lanto Griffin - current professional golfer on the PGA Tour
Sherman Hamilton – former member of Canadian National Men's Basketball Team; participated in 2000 Olympics in Sydney, Australia
Gerald Henderson – played for the Boston Celtics, Detroit Pistons, Seattle SuperSonics, and San Antonio Spurs, winning four NBA championships
Quanitra Hollingsworth – center for the Washington Mystics of the WNBA; member of Turkey's 2012 Olympic women's basketball team
Brandon Inge – MLB infielder, formerly with the Pittsburgh Pirates, Oakland Athletics and Detroit Tigers
Sean Marshall – relief pitcher for the Cincinnati Reds
Eric Maynor – played for the Washington Wizards and Philadelphia 76ers
Cla Meredith – former MLB relief pitcher; played for the Boston Red Sox, San Diego Padres and Baltimore Orioles
Hayley Moorwood – member of New Zealand women's Olympic Soccer Team in Beijing in 2008 and London in 2012
Dominic Oduro – current forward for the Columbus Crew in MLS
Juvonte Reddic (born 1992) - basketball player in the Israeli Basketball Premier League
John Rollins – professional golfer and PGA pro
Larry Sanders – drafted #15 overall by the Milwaukee Bucks in the 2010 NBA Draft
Gonzalo Segares – former defender for Apollon Limassol in Cyprus; former defender for the Chicago Fire in MLS
Scott Sizemore – infielder for the Oakland Athletics
Justin Tillman (born 1996) - basketball player for Hapoel Tel Aviv in the Israeli Basketball Premier League
 Brianté Weber (born 1992) - basketball player in the Israeli Basketball Premier League

Other 
Mirta Martin (Ph.D. 1996) – ninth president of Fort Hays State University

References

Virginia Commonwealth University alumni